Burn Notice is an American television series that originally aired on the cable television channel USA Network from June 28, 2007 to September 12, 2013. The show follows the life of protagonist Michael Westen (Jeffrey Donovan), a covert operative who has been "burned" (identified as an unreliable or dangerous agent) and tries to find out why. With his assets frozen, he is unable to leave Miami and forced to live off any small investigative jobs he can find, with the help of his girlfriend Fiona Glenanne (Gabrielle Anwar) and his old military friend Sam Axe (Bruce Campbell), who briefly informed on him to the FBI. His return to Miami also reunites him with his mother Madeline Westen (Sharon Gless), who becomes an increasingly important part of Michael's life even as he tries to hide his activities from her. Underpinning the episodic stories of Michael's investigative jobs is the running subplot exploring Michael's efforts to find out who burned him, and to get his job and reputation back.

As creator of the show, Matt Nix serves as executive producer and often writes episodes for the show.  He made his directorial debut with the season two episode "Do No Harm", which he had also written. Seven seasons have completed airing in the United States, with 12 episodes in the first season, 16 episodes in the second and third seasons, and 18 episodes in the fourth season. The fourth season introduced new regular character Jesse Porter (Coby Bell), a counterintelligence agent whom Michael unintentionally burns but later makes part of his team. In October 2009, USA Networks announced the renewal of the series for seasons 5 and 6. The show's fifth season, comprising 18 episodes, began airing June 23, 2011, and entered a mid-season break after twelve episodes on September 8, 2011. The remaining episodes aired in November and December 2011, for a finale on December 15, 2011.  The program concluded its 18-episode sixth season, which premiered on June 14, 2012, and ended on December 20, 2012, with a two-hour finale. On November 7, 2012, USA Networks renewed Burn Notice for a seventh season, and, on May 10, 2013, announced that it would be the series' final season. The seventh season premiered on June 6, 2013, and the series reached its 100th episode with "Forget Me Not", the second episode of that season. The series finale aired on September 12, 2013. A total of 111 episodes of Burn Notice were broadcast over seven seasons.

Series overview

Episodes

Season 1 (2007)

Season 2 (2008–09)

Season 3 (2009–10)

The third season of Burn Notice premiered on June 4, 2009. Both Nix and Donovan have revealed that the season will focus on the past of Michael, Fiona and Sam. Ben Shenkman ("Tom Strickler"), Moon Bloodgood ("Detective Paxson"), and Otto Sanchez ("Agent Diego Garza") appeared in recurring roles during the summer season. The winter season premiered on January 21, 2010, opening with the reunion of actors Tyne Daly and Sharon Gless nearly 14 years after they last teamed up as Cagney and Lacey. Recurring characters in the winter season include Chris Vance as Mason Gilroy, a spy handler known as a "puppetmaster" with whom Michael must work.

Season 4 (2010)

Burn Notice was renewed for a fourth season that began airing on June 3, 2010.  The season also featured the directorial debut of Jeffrey Donovan who directed the third aired episode of the season "Made Man". Coby Bell joined the cast as Jesse Porter, a counterintelligence expert who can easily assume cover identities and has a burning desire to catch criminals.  Robert Wisdom portrayed Vaughn, a spy working for those who burned Michael, in a minimum of six episodes.  Burt Reynolds guest-starred as a legend in the spy business whose story serves as a look forward to what Michael's life could become.  Additionally, Tim Matheson reprised his role as "Dead" Larry Sizemore and Jay Karnes reprised his role as Tyler Brennen. The fourth season was extended by two episodes to 18. The season was broadcast in two parts, with the first part ending on August 26, and the final six episodes beginning on November 11 and concluding on December 16, 2010.

Season 5 (2011)
 
Burn Notice was renewed for a fifth season, consisting of 18 episodes, on April 16, 2010.  The first half of the fifth season concluded airing after 12 episodes on September 8, 2011, with the remaining six episodes beginning on November 3, 2011. The season concluded in December, 2011.

Season 6 (2012)

A sixth season, consisting of 18 episodes, was ordered by USA Network on April 16, 2010. This announcement came just over a month after the third season had completed airing. The season began in summer 2012.

Season 7 (2013)

USA renewed Burn Notice for a 13-episode seventh season on November 7, 2012. Production began Monday, March 18, 2013 and episodes began airing on June 6, 2013. USA Network announced May 10, 2013 that the seventh season of Burn Notice would be its last.

Television film (2011)
The prequel film "The Fall of Sam Axe" both explores Sam's downfall shortly prior to the opening of the series and sets up elements of season five.

Ratings

Home video releases

References

External links
 

 
Lists of American crime drama television series episodes
Lists of American espionage television series episodes